Daniel or Dan Weiss may refer to:
 D. B. Weiss (born 1971), American television writer, director, and producer
 Daniel Weiss (art historian) (fl. 1979), president of the Metropolitan Museum of Art
 Daniel Weiss (figure skater) (born 1968), German figure skater
 Daniel Weiss (ice hockey) (born 1990), German ice hockey player
 Dan Weiss (basketball) (born 1966), US-born Japanese basketball player and coach
 Dan Weiss (drummer) (born 1977), American jazz drummer and composer

See also
 Danny Weis (born 1948), founding member of both Iron Butterfly and Rhinoceros